The Burundi National Defence Force ( du Burundi, or FDNB) is the state military organisation responsible for the defence of Burundi.

A general staff (État-Major Général) commands the armed forces, consisting of a joint staff (État-Major inter-armes); a training staff (État-Major de la Formation), and a logistics staff (État-Major de la Logistique). Naval and aviation commands exist, as well as specialised units.

History

Independence and early history (1962–1993)
Under Belgian colonial rule, the mandatory status of Ruanda-Urundi established limits on the recruitment of Barundi for military service. Instead, Ruanda-Urundi was garrisoned by a small unit of the Force Publique recruited in the Belgian Congo which combined its military role with the role of gendarmerie. Its members were popularly known as Bamina in Burundi, after the large military base at Kamina in the Congo. Amid the Congo's independence, the Belgian colonial administration formed the Burundian National Guard (Garde Nationale Burundaise) in 1960. It consisted of 650 men, recruited equally from the Hutu and Tutsi ethnic groups (though the Tutsi mostly consisted of those from the Hima subgroup). When Burundi became independent in 1962 the force was renamed the Burundian National Army (Armée Nationale Burundaise) and assumed a purely military function. The gendarmarie function was allocated to a civilian authority called the National Gendarmerie (Gendarmerie nationale) after independence in 1962, though this became part of the army on 7 March 1967.

Burundi became independent on 1 July 1962 with the army organised into eight platoons. A coup attempt in October 1965 led by the Hutu-dominated police was carried out but failed. The Tutsi dominated army, then led by Tutsi officer Captain Michel Micombero purged Hutu from their ranks and carried out reprisal attacks which ultimately claimed the lives of up to 5,000 people in a predecessor to Burundian genocides. Micombero then became Prime Minister.

King Mwambutsa IV, who had fled the country during the October 1965 coup attempt, was deposed by a coup in July 1966 and his teenage son, Crown Prince Charles Ndizeye, claimed the throne as King Ntare V. Later that same year, Prime Minister, then-Captain, Michel Micombero, carried out another coup in November 1966, this time deposing Ntare, abolishing the monarchy and declaring the nation a republic. His one-party government was effectively a military dictatorship. As president, Micombero became an advocate of African socialism and received support from China. He imposed a staunch regime of law and order and sharply repressed Hutu militarism. After Micombero's coup d’etat which deposed the monarchy, he became the first general in Burundian history. He was also commissioned by the National Council of the Revolution (French: Conseil National de la Révolution (CNR)), and made a Lieutenant Général. In his turn, Micombero raised Thomas Ndabemeye to the grade of Major General. They were the sole generals of the First Republic.

In 1972 the Tutsi-dominated Burundi Army and government carried out a series of mass killings, the Ikiza, often characterised as a genocide, primarily against educated and elite Hutus who lived in the country. Conservative estimates place the death toll of the event between 100,000 and 150,000 killed, while some estimates of the death toll go as high as 300,000. This included a purge of all Hutus and some politically unfavorable Tutsis from the military, shrinking it to about 2,300 members On 30 December 1974 a naval division was created.

In 1981–82 the IISS estimated that the Burundian armed forces were 6,000 strong, with 2 infantry battalions, 1 airborne battalion, 1 commando battalion, and an armoured car company. The same estimate was repeated in the 1988–89 edition except that the strength figure had been dropped to 5,500.

The Civil War and aftermath
In 1993, Hutu President Melchior Ndadaye was elected in the 1 June presidential election and was sworn in on 10 July.

On 21 October, a coup was attempted by a Tutsi–dominated National Defence Force  faction, led by Chief of Staff Lt. Col. Jean Bikomagu, ex-President Jean-Baptiste Bagaza, and former interior minister François Ngeze. The coup attempt resulted in the assassination of Ndadaye and numerous other casualties. 
Following the coup, the Committee of Public Salvation (CSP) was created as the ruling junta, and François Ngeze (a prominent Hutu member of UPRONA) was installed as the new president. Ngeze himself comdemned the assassination of Ndadaye. Faced with widespread condemnation, the Army leaders urged civilian politicians to resume control. Consequently, Prime Minister Sylvie Kinigi (who took refuge in the French embassy with other senior government figures) was installed as Acting President on 27 October.

The 1996 UN inquiry names three units - para 122-3 indicates that at the time of the October coup, the 2e Commando were the presidential guard and the 1er Parachutiste and 11e Blinde were the units involved in the coup. (Para 115 notes that some officers of the 2e Commando were previously involved in an attempted coup in July, before Ndadaye was sworn in, but presumably by October the unit was thought to be loyal). In addition, U.S. Ambassador Bob Krueger mentions members of the 1st Parachute Battalion being active during the coup in his book.

The coup attempted sparked the Burundian Civil War, which lasted from 1993 to 2005, killing an estimated 300,000 people. The Arusha Accords ended 12 years of war and stopped decades of ethnic killings. The 2005 constitution provided guaranteed representation for both Hutu and Tutsi, and 2005 parliamentary elections that led to Pierre Nkurunziza, from the Hutu FDD, becoming president.

According to a 2004 report by Child Soldiers International, Burundi's military used conscripted child soldiers. Children in military service were subject to military courts which fell short of international law standards.

The armed forces have deployed significant numbers of troops to the African Union Mission in Somalia since c. 2007. On February 1, 2007 Burundi committed to the mission, pledging up to 1,000 troops. By March 27, it was confirmed that 1700 Burundian troops would be sent to Somalia. In 2011 the IISS estimated that three Burundian battalions were deployed there. The army's forces in 2011 included, according to IISS estimates, 2 light armoured battalions (squadrons), seven infantry battalions and independent companies; and artillery, engineer, and air defence battalions (SA-7 'Grail' man-portable SAMs and 14.5mm, 23mm and 37mm guns were reported). Separately reported were the 22nd commando battalion (Gitega) and 124th commando battalion Bujumbura). Despite the elapse of another six years, the 2017 listing from the Military Balance was essentially unchanged except for an increase in size to some 30,000 and the addition of ten reserve infantry battalions.

In the wake of the Burundian unrest, personnel faced a choice between supporting President Pierre Nkurunziza, with whom some fought when he was a military commander, or opposing him. Interviewed by Reuters on May 14, 2015, an Africa analyst at Verisk Maplecroft said a coup then reported in progress by Major General Godefroid Niyombare, former director of the intelligence service, "starkly highlight[ed] Nkurunziza’s lack of unified support among his military chiefs." "Even if Niyombare’s attempt fails, Nkurunziza’s political credibility may be damaged irreparably."

The 121e Régiment de Parachutistes were mentioned in French news articles as one of the units that supported the attempted coup in 2015.

In the aftermath of the coup and the later disputed election, armed forces chief of staff Major General Prime Niyongabo survived an assassination attempt on September 11, 2015.

In 2015/16, Laurent Touchard wrote that the BNDF included ten two-battalion infantry brigades. (Touchard 2016)

Organization

Equipment

Infantry small arms

Anti-tank weapons

Vehicles

Artillery

Aircraft inventory
The Burundi Army's air unit operates 11 aircraft, including one combat aircraft and six helicopters, of which two are non-operational as of 2012.

References

Sources

 

Burundi Defence Review Lessons Learned